Siegfried Lowitz (22 September 1914 – 27 June 1999) was a German actor.

Born in Berlin, he played the Hauptkommissar Erwin Köster in the German television drama Der Alte.
Prior to his tenure as Hauptkommissar, he played a killer in the popular German police series Derrick.

He died at Munich in 1999.

Filmography

Film

 Meines Vaters Pferde, 2. Teil: Seine dritte Frau (1954) - Zeisig, Bursche des Oberleutnant Michael Godeysen (uncredited)
 The Angel with the Flaming Sword (1954) - Krüger
 Hello, My Name is Cox (1955) - Gauner Anton Kraczyk
 Jackboot Mutiny (1955)
 Solang' es hübsche Mädchen gibt (1955)
 Hanussen (1955) - Prosecutor
 The Fisherman from Heiligensee (1955) - Gilchert
 Sky Without Stars (1955) - Hüske
 Regine (1956) - Direktor Gisevius
 Weil du arm bist, mußt du früher sterben (1956) - Arzt des Krankenhauses
 The Captain from Köpenick (1956) - Stadtkämmerer Rosenkranz
 My Father, the Actor (1956) - Ruehl, Agent
 Das Sonntagskind (1956) - Kriminalinspektor
 King in Shadow (1957) - Chamberlain Goldberg
 Rose Bernd (1957) - Judge
 The Girl and the Legend (1957) - Mr. Greene
  (1957) - Leutnant Pauli
 Escape from Sahara (1958) - Kapitän Gerlach
 The Doctor of Stalingrad (1958) - Walter Grosse
 The Copper (1958) - Dr. Schreiber
 I Was All His (1958) - Herr Hinze
 Confess, Doctor Corda (1958) - Inspektor Guggitz
 It Happened in Broad Daylight (1958) - Leutnant Henzi
 The Man Who Couldn't Say No (1958) - Alfons Ulrich
 Der Schinderhannes (1958) - Benzel
 Der Frosch mit der Maske (1959) - (Ober-) Inspektor Elk (German version) / (Chief) Inspector Hedge (English version)
 Headquarters State Secret (1960) - Albrecht, Hauptsturmführer
 The Black Sheep (1960) - Flambeau
 The Forger of London (1961) - Oberinspektor Bourke
  (1962) - Kommissar Brahm
 The Brain (1962) - Mr. Walters
 Dog Eat Dog (1964) - Bank Guard (scenes deleted)
 Der Hexer (1964) - Inspektor Warren
 The Sinister Monk (1965) - Sir Richard
 Dr. M schlägt zu (1972) - Dr. Orloff

Television
 The Time Has Come (1960, TV series) - Inspector Kenton
  (1963) - Juror 3
  (1964) - Kriminalinspektor Richard Voß
  (1966, TV miniseries) - Dennis MacLeod
 Der Trinker (1967, TV film) - Schlehdorn
  (1968, TV miniseries) - Weingarten
 Der Kommissar (1969, Season 1, Episode 9 "Geld von toten Kassierern") - Louis Kranz
 Derrick (1974, Season 1, Episode 3: "Stiftungsfest") - August Bark
  (1975, TV miniseries) - Maître Magloire
 The Old Fox (1977-1986) - Kommissar Erwin Köster
 La piovra,  (1992, TV miniseries) - Milos Danick
 Anna Maria – Eine Frau geht ihren Weg (1994-1997, TV series) - Alfred Langer

External links

Siegfried Lowitz Found

1914 births
1999 deaths
German male television actors
German male film actors
Male actors from Berlin
20th-century German male actors